The 1952 World Table Tennis Championships women's singles was the 19th edition of the women's singles championship.
Angelica Rozeanu defeated Gizi Farkas in the final by three sets to two, to win a third consecutive title.

Results

+ Time limit rule applied

See also
 List of World Table Tennis Championships medalists

References

-
1952 in women's table tennis